The 1986 24 Hours of Le Mans was the 54th Grand Prix of Endurance as well as the third round of the 1986 World Sports-Prototype Championship.  It took place on 31 May and 1 June 1986.

Pre-race
Due to construction of a new roundabout at the Mulsanne corner, a new portion of track had to be built in order to avoid the roundabout.  This created a right hand kink prior to the new Mulsanne turn.

Race
For 1986, the new works 962C of Hans-Joachim Stuck, Derek Bell and Al Holbert was able to overcome the two-time defending winners at Joest Racing.  The race itself was marred by the death of Jo Gartner in a crash on the Mulsanne Straight early on Sunday morning while running in 8th place. The sole remaining Kremer Racing Porsche retired soon after the accident.  The Joest/Ludwig car suffered from engine bearing failure following the extended pace car laps.

Official results
Class winners in bold.  Cars failing to complete 70% of the winner's distance marked as Not Classified (NC).

† - #66 Cosmik Racing and #79 Ecurie Ecosse were both disqualified for receiving outside assistance.

Statistics
 Pole Position - Jochen Mass, #2 Rothmans Porsche - 3:15.990 (154.402 mph/248.492 km/h)
 Fastest Lap - Klaus Ludwig, #7 Joest Racing - 3:23.300
 Distance - 4972.731 km
 Average Speed - 207.197 km/h

Notes

References

 
 

24 Hours of Le Mans races
Le Mans
Le Mans
Le Mans